Saint Mary's Bay is the name of several places:

 St. Mary's Bay, Newfoundland and Labrador
 St. Marys Bay, Nova Scotia, Canada

 Saint Marys Bay, New Zealand, a suburb of Auckland, New Zealand
 St Mary's Bay, Kent, a village in England
 St. Mary's Bay, Devon, a beach near Brixham, England